The 2019 UCF Knights men's soccer team represented the University of Central Florida during the 2019 NCAA Division I men's soccer season and the 2019 American Athletic Conference men's soccer season. The regular season began on August 30 and concluded on November 5. It was the program's 44th season fielding a men's varsity soccer team, and their 7th season in the AAC. The 2019 season was Scott Calabrese's third year as head coach for the program.

UCF finished the season with a 15–3–2 overall record and a 6–0–1 conference record, best in the AAC. The Knights advanced to the finals of the AAC Tournament where they fell to SMU for the third consecutive year. They received an at-large bid to the NCAA Tournament and advanced to the third round where they were defeated by SMU.

Background 

The Knights are coming off a 13–3–3 season where they finished 5–1–1 in AAC play, earning them their first American Athletic Conference regular season title. In the 2018 American Athletic Conference Men's Soccer Tournament, UCF lost to SMU in penalty kicks, 4–5 after a 1–1 draw in regulation and extra time. UCF earned an at-large berth into the 2018 NCAA Division I Men's Soccer Tournament, where they were one of the 16 seeded teams (out of 48 teams total) given the 14 seed. It was UCF's first NCAA Tournament appearance since 2011. With the seed, they earned a bye into the second round where they hosted the winner of Washington and Lipscomb. Lipscomb beat Washington in penalties, and also ended up beating the Knights in overtime, thus ending the season for UCF.

Junior striker, Cal Jennings, lead UCF in goals and assists for 2018 and was named a consensus All-American with Top Drawer Soccer, Soccer America, United Soccer Coaches, and CollegeSoccerNews.com all naming him as a first-team All-American.

Player movement

Departures

Incoming transfers

High school recruits

Roster

Team management

Schedule 

|-
!colspan=6 style=""| Preseason
|-

|-
!colspan=6 style=""| Non-conference regular season
|-

|-
!colspan=6 style=""| American Athletic regular season
|-

|-
!colspan=6 style=""| AAC Tournament
|-

|-
!colspan=6 style=""| NCAA Tournament
|-

|-

Awards and honors

2020 MLS Super Draft

Rankings

References

External links 
 UCF Soccer

2019
UCF Knights
UCF Knights
UCF Knights men's soccer
UCF Knights